The Seohocheon is a river in Suwon, South Korea.  It has its source on the southern slopes of Gwanggyosan and flows south, through Cheoncheon-dong, past Dongnam Health College, to Seoho (West Lake), near Hwaseo Station.  From there, it continues south and joins the Hwanggujicheon.  There is a path alongside much of the length of the stream and this is currently being extended north towards the source.

Gallery

See also
Rivers of Korea
Geography of South Korea

Rivers of South Korea